Beirut I Love You is a Lebanese television/web-series which aired on the Lebanese Broadcasting Corporation (LBC). The series stars Mounia Akl and Cyril Aris, both of whom developed the show.

Concept 
The series follows several 20-somethings living in Beirut as they attempt to balance work, love, and life.

Production
Beirut I Love You is produced by Orange Dog Productions and shoots on location in Beirut, Lebanon. The LBC ordered 35 episodes of the show.

Following season two it was announced that the show would be put on hiatus while Mounia and Cyril completed Masters of Fine Arts in Directing/Screenwriting at Columbia University in New York.

References

External links
Official website

Lebanese television series
2010s Lebanese television series
Lebanese Broadcasting Corporation International original programming